Nie is a Chinese surname. It is the 126th surname in the Hundred Family Surnames. It is spelled Nip in Cantonese and Nieh in Wade–Giles.It is mainly distributed in Henan, and some are distributed in Jiangxi, Fujian, Hubei, Taiwan and other places.

One branch of the Nie family who were descendants of the traitorous Nie Yi changed their surname to Zhang to avoid being associated with him. Descendants of this line include Cao Wei official Zhang Liao.

Notable people
Nie Bichu, mayor of Tianjin
Nie Er, Chinese composer in the 20th century
Nie Haisheng, Chinese astronaut
Nie Li, lieutenant general of People's Liberation Army, daughter of Nie Rongzhen
Nie Rongzhen, marshal of the People's Liberation Army
Nie Shicheng, general in Qing Dynasty
Nie Weiping, professional weiqi player
Nie Yuan, actor
Nie Yuanzi, key figure in the Cultural Revolution
Nie Xiaoqian, fictional character in eponymous story by Pu Songling
 Nieh Pin-chieh (聶品潔; born 1988), Taiwanese swimmer who specialized in sprint freestyle events

See also

Nia (given name)

Chinese-language surnames
Individual Chinese surnames